Hans-Joachim Kulenkampff, nickname Kuli (27 April 1921 in Bremen14 August 1998 in Seeham) was a German actor and TV host, remembered mainly as host of Einer wird gewinnen, a quiz show that ran from 1964 to 1987.

In 1967, he hosted Miss Germany pageant

Selected filmography
 Bonjour Kathrin (1956) - Columbus
 Immer die Radfahrer (1958) - Ulrich Salandt 
  (1959) - Dr. Clausen
 Kein Mann zum Heiraten (1959) - Wolf Kruse
  (1960) - John Morton, fröhlicher junger Mann aus Texas + Franz Huber, Musikalienhändler
 Three Men in a Boat (1961) - Harry Berg
 Dr. Fabian: Laughing Is the Best Medicine (1969) - Dr. med. Paul Fabian
 Starke Zeiten (1988) - Hans-Joachim Jennings

External links 

 
 Realplayer-Stream NDR-Talkshow 15 and 29 January 1988
 WDR Report on Hans-Joachim Kulenkampff

German game show hosts
Hessischer Rundfunk people
1921 births
1998 deaths
Ernst Busch Academy of Dramatic Arts alumni
Beauty pageant hosts
ARD (broadcaster) people
German television talk show hosts